Abraham Jones (1875–1942) was an English footballer who played in the Football League for Middlesbrough and West Bromwich Albion. His son, another Abraham, also played league football.

Jones was a reserve for England for the 1903–04 British Home Championship match away to Scotland, which England won 1–0, but he was never capped.

References

1875 births
1942 deaths
Sportspeople from Tipton
English footballers
Association football defenders
West Bromwich Albion F.C. players
Middlesbrough F.C. players
Luton Town F.C. players
English Football League players